Katarzyna Piter (born 16 February 1991) is a Polish professional tennis player.

In the spring of 2014, she reached her career-high rankings, No. 95 in singles and 67 (new high in July 2022: No. 66) in doubles. She has won eight singles and 25 doubles titles on the ITF Women's Circuit.

In July 2013 at Palermo, Piter won her sole title on the WTA Tour. Partnering with Kristina Mladenovic, they upset Karolína and Kristýna Plíšková in the final, in a super-tiebreak decision.

Fed Cup
Piter played 2009 for Poland in the Europe/Africa Zone I of the Fed Cup and helped them qualify for the World Group II Play-offs against Japan. In the round-robin stage, she lost her match against Monica Niculescu of Romania, won against Johanna Larsson of Sweden, beat Dijana Stojić of Bosnia and Herzegovina and paired up with Klaudia Jans to beat the Bosnian pairing. In the first play-off against Great Britain, she lost the first singles match to Elena Baltacha 4–6, 1–6. Poland, however, won that tie.

Performance timelines

Only main-draw results in WTA Tour, Grand Slam tournaments, Fed Cup/Billie Jean King Cup and Olympic Games are included in win–loss records.

Singles

Doubles

WTA career finals

Doubles: 7 (1 title, 6 runner–ups)

WTA Challenger finals

Doubles: 1 (1 runner-up)

ITF Circuit finals

Singles: 20 (8 titles, 12 runner–ups)

Doubles: 49 (25 titles, 24 runner–ups)

See also
 Poland Fed Cup team

Notes

References

External links

 
 
 

1991 births
Living people
Sportspeople from Poznań
Polish female tennis players
20th-century Polish women
21st-century Polish women